The Tulane Green Wave football team represents Tulane University in the sport of American football. The Green Wave compete in the Football Bowl Subdivision (FBS) of the National Collegiate Athletic Association (NCAA) as a member of the American Athletic Conference (The American). The football team is coached by Willie Fritz, and plays its home games in Yulman Stadium on its campus in Uptown New Orleans.

History

Conference affiliations
Tulane has been both an independent and affiliated with multiple conferences.
 Independent (1893–1894)
 Southern Intercollegiate Athletic Association (1895–1921)
 Southern Conference (1922–1932)
 Southeastern Conference (1933–1965)
 Independent (1966–1995)
 Conference USA (1996–2013)
 American Athletic Conference (2014–present)

Championships

Conference championships
Tulane has won 10 conference football championships in five different conferences.

† Co-championship

Division championships

† Co-championship

Bowl games

Tulane has played in 15 official bowl games, with the Green Wave garnering a record of 7–8. Tulane also played in the Bacardi Bowl in 1909, playing the Havana Athletic Club, losing 11–0. This was not sanctioned by the NCAA, and thus the Green Wave do not recognize the bowl appearance. Notably, Tulane's first bowl win was the inaugural Sugar Bowl, played in their home stadium.

Head coaches

The team has had 39 head coaches and 1 interim head coach since Tulane began playing football in 1893. 13 coaches have led the program to postseason bowl games: R. R. Brown, Bernie Bierman, Ted Cox, Red Dawson, Jim Pittman, Bennie Ellender, Larry Smith, Vince Gibson, Mack Brown, Tommy Bowden, Chris Scelfo, Curtis Johnson, and Willie Fritz. While Tommy Bowden led the 1998 team to a perfect 11–0 regular season and the 1998 Liberty Bowl, Chris Scelfo coached the team during that game. Seven coaches have led the team to conference championships: Clark Shaughnessy (1 SIAA and 1 SoCon), Bernie Bierman (3 SoCon), Ted Cox (1 SEC), Red Dawson (1 SEC), Henry E. Frnka (1 SEC), Tommy Bowden (1 C-USA), and Willie Fritz (1 AAC). 

Clark Shaughnessy and Chris Scelfo are tied as the all-time leaders in games coached at Tulane with 94 each. Clark Shaughnessy is the all-time leader in years coached (11) and total wins (59). The current head coach, Willie Fritz, has the second-most program wins (43) of all time.

Home stadium

The Green Wave have played their home games in Yulman Stadium on its Uptown campus since 2014. Prior to that season, Tulane played home games in the Louisiana Superdome for nearly 40 seasons, and in its previous on-campus venue, the third Tulane Stadium, before that. The Green Wave have also played at the second Tulane Stadium, first Tulane Stadium, Athletic Park and Crescent City Base Ball Park.

Because Tulane's campus is landlocked within Uptown New Orleans, Yulman is tightly fit within its athletic footprint and directly abutting the surrounding neighborhood. The stadium has a capacity of 30,000 spectators and was constructed with the ability to expand.

Rivalries

LSU 

Tulane's biggest and oldest rival was LSU. It began in 1893 with a 34–0 Green Wave victory over the Tigers. The teams stopped meeting every year in the Battle for the Rag in 2009. The rivalry became less competitive after 1948, until Tulane broke a 25-game non-winning streak in 1973 with a 14–0 victory in front of a Tulane Stadium record crowd of 86,598 in the final installment of the long-time rivalry played on Tulane's campus. Between 1979 and 1982, Tulane won three out of four games against the Tigers; the 1982 win was the last win to date. The two schools stopped playing annually after the 1994 game; however, they have met six times (1996, 2001, 2006, 2007, 2008, and 2009) since. As a condition of the broken series agreement made in 2006, a potential future game will be played in a future season in New Orleans. LSU leads the series 69–23–7 through the 2019 season.

Southern Miss 

Known as the Battle for the Bell, Tulane's rivalry with Southern Miss was played yearly from 1979 until 2006 and alternates sites between New Orleans and Hattiesburg, Mississippi. As a result of Conference USA splitting into East and West divisions in 2005, the game was played two out of every four years. The rivalry was put on hold as a result of Tulane's move to The American Athletic Conference in 2014, but in 2017 the schools announced new games slated for 2022, 2023, 2026, and 2027. Southern Miss leads the series 24–9 through the 2022 season.

Auburn 

Tulane leads the series with Auburn 17–15–6 through the 2019 season.

Ole Miss 

Ole Miss leads the series 42–28 through the 2018 season.

Culture

Marching band

The Tulane University Marching Band (TUMB) was founded in 1920 as a military band. It dissolved shortly after the team's move to the Superdome in the 1970s and did not formally return until 2006. The TUMB performs at home games each fall and in Mardi Gras parades each spring.

Mascot
Riptide the Pelican debuted in 1998 with the re-branding of Tulane athletics. Prior to that, the school used an angry wave nicknamed "Gumby" by fans, and before that a John Chase creation named "Greenie."

Individual honors

All-Americans

Tulane has had 19 players named to first-team All-America teams. Of those 19, five were consensus selections, with one being a unanimous selection.

All-time record vs. AAC teams 
Records current as of January 2, 2023

Future opponents

Non-conference
Announced schedules as of January 12, 2023.

See also
 American Athletic Conference
 List of NCAA Division I FBS football programs

References

External links

 

 
American football teams established in 1893
1893 establishments in Louisiana